The four teams in this group played against each other on a home-and-away basis. The winner Switzerland qualified for the eighth FIFA World Cup held in England.

Matches

 

 

 

 

 

 

 

 

 

 

 

Switzerland qualified.

Final Table

Team stats

Head coach:  Alfredo Foni

Head coach:  Bertie Peacock

Head coach:  Elek Schwartz (first match);  Denis Neville (second to sixth match)

Head coach:  Zyber Konçi (first to fifth match);  Loro Boriçi (sixth match)

External links
FIFA official page
RSSSF - 1966 World Cup Qualification
Allworldcup

5
1965–66 in Swiss football
1964–65 in Swiss football
1965–66 in Northern Ireland association football
1964–65 in Northern Ireland association football
1965–66 in Dutch football
1964–65 in Dutch football
1965–66 in Albanian football
1964–65 in Albanian football
1963–64 in Dutch football
1963–64 in Albanian football